NotI is a restriction enzyme isolated from the bacterium Nocardia otitidis.

References

Restriction enzymes